Tuburan is the name of two municipalities in the Philippines:

Tuburan, Cebu
Tuburan, Basilan